Wendlinger is a German surname. Notable people with the surname include:

Heinz Wendlinger, West German bobsledder
Karl Wendlinger (born 1968), Austrian racing driver

See also
Weidlinger (disambiguation)

German-language surnames